The Centre for Poland is a Polish conservative political party. It was formed on 2 May 2022 by former Civic Platform MPs and local government activists affiliated with the Polish Coalition. The goal of the group is to unify the conservative wing of the Coalition and to attract young conservative and nationalistic voters.

Deputies
Deputies were elected on Polish Coalition and Civic Platform lists.

 Ireneusz Raś: leader of the party.
 Jacek Tomczak
 Radosław Lubczyk
 Kazimierz Michał Ujazdowski

Ideology
The party has yet to provide a full ideological manifesto, but has been described by journalists as a party created by the Polish Coalition with the goal of attracting young, conservative and patriotic voters that are dissatisfied with the current government's policies. The inaugural congress has been attended by Polish politicians including Aleksander Hall and former president Bronisław Komorowski.

References

External links
Facebook account

2022 establishments in Poland
Political parties established in 2022
Liberal conservative parties in Poland